The Danskin Power Plant is a gas-fired power plant owned and operated by Idaho Power.  The plant is housed in the Evander Andrews Complex near Mountain Home, Idaho, United States.

The 261-megawatt plant consists of one 171-MW simple cycle combustion turbine, which came online in May 2008.

The first generating units on the site were two Westinghouse W251 simple cycle turbines which were commissioned in September 2001.

Government agencies believe Danskin Power Plant may have negative impacts on the surrounding environment.

External links

Buildings and structures in Elmore County, Idaho
Natural gas-fired power stations in Idaho
Energy infrastructure completed in 2008
2008 establishments in Idaho
Idaho Power